Botniahalvøya is a peninsula of Nordaustlandet, Svalbard. It is located between Lady Franklinfjorden and Brennevinsfjorden. It has a length of about twelve nautical miles. The highest peak is Franklinfjellet, at 430 m.a.s.l.

References

Peninsulas of Svalbard
Nordaustlandet